Growth hormone 1, also known as pituitary growth hormone or simply as growth hormone (GH)  somatotropin, is a protein that in humans is encoded by the GH1 gene.

The protein encoded by this gene is a member of the somatotropin/prolactin family of hormones that play an important role in growth control. The gene, along with four other related genes, is located at the growth hormone locus on chromosome 17 where they are interspersed in the same transcriptional orientation, an arrangement thought to have evolved by a series of gene duplications. The five genes share a remarkably high degree of sequence identity. Alternative splicing generates additional isoforms of each of the five growth hormones, leading to further diversity and potential for specialization. This particular family member is expressed in the pituitary but not in placental tissue as is the case for the other four genes in the growth hormone locus. Mutations in or deletions of the gene lead to growth hormone deficiency and short stature.

See also
 Placental growth hormone
 Somatotropin family

References

Further reading

Hormones of the somatotropic axis